Lower Dean is a village located in the Borough of Bedford in Bedfordshire, England.

The village forms part of the Dean and Shelton civil parish (where the 2011 Census population was included), and is close to the county border with Northamptonshire and the district of Huntingdonshire in Cambridgeshire.

Villages in Bedfordshire
Borough of Bedford